This article details the Hull F.C. Rugby League Football Club's 2018 season.

Fixtures and results

Pre-season friendlies

Super League fixtures

Super League Super 8's

Challenge Cup

Transfers

In

Out

References

External links
hullfc.com Hull FC Website

Hull F.C. seasons
Super League XXIII by club